Donald W. Koivisto (born August 18, 1949) is a Democratic politician from the U.S. state of Michigan.

Political career 
Koivisto was elected to the Michigan House of Representatives in 1980. During his time there, he chaired the Agriculture Committee and helped write the state's right-to-farm act. In 1990, Koivisto was elected a Michigan State Senator from the 38th district, succeeding Joe Mack, who had represented much of the Upper Peninsula since 1960. Koivisto served as state senator until 2003 when he was term-limited. In August 2007, the Michigan Commission of Agriculture appointed Koivisto as Director of the Michigan Department of Agriculture.

References 

1949 births
Living people
People from Ironwood, Michigan
Central Michigan University alumni
Democratic Party members of the Michigan House of Representatives
Democratic Party Michigan state senators
State cabinet secretaries of Michigan
20th-century American politicians
21st-century American politicians